Abdel Hamid Bassiouny (born 15 December 1971) is an Egyptian footballer. He previously played in Egypt for Kafr El-Sheikh, Zamalek, Ismaily and Haras El-Hodood.

Managerial statistics

References

External links
Abdul-Hamid Bassiouny at Footballdatabase

1971 births
Living people
Zamalek SC players
Egyptian footballers
1999 FIFA Confederations Cup players
Ismaily SC players
Haras El Hodoud SC players
Egyptian Premier League players
Egyptian Premier League managers
Haras El Hodoud SC managers
People from Kafr El Sheikh Governorate
Association football forwards
Egyptian football managers
Egypt international footballers
Oman Professional League managers
Egyptian expatriate football managers
Egyptian expatriate sportspeople in Oman
Expatriate football managers in Oman
Tala'ea El Gaish SC managers
Ghazl El Mahalla SC managers
Smouha SC managers